Rurkee (Rurki) ਰੁੜਕੀ is a village in Jalandhar district in Punjab. This village has two sides (ਪਾਸੇ), Dhad Rurkee and Khaire di Patti.The major caste in Rurkee is the Jatt caste. Although there are many Tarkhans in the village, there are also a variety of Ad Dharmi families on the other side of the village. Most of the people belong to the last name Kooner, Reehal & Sagoo in Rurkee. The vast majority of this village belongs to the Sikh religion and the minority are Hindus.

Villages neighbouring Rurkee include Rurka Kalan, Ghurka, Randhawa, and Pasla, Cities near Rurkee are Goraya, Phagwara, Nurmahal and Phillaur. Rurkee has a water tank which supplies water to Rurkee and a variety of other villages within the region. Rurkee also has its own bus stop which people from neighboring villages come to. Many banks and factories (ਕਾਰਖਾਣੇ) are in this village which has been instrumental in generating employment opportunities within the village. Subsequently, there are a range of employment opportunities within Rurkee. 

Rurkee has many notable Kabaddi players such as Sohan Kooner, Goggo Kooner, and Jeeta Kooner (U.K). Rurkee also has a world renown team known as the Shaheed Bhagat Singh Sports club, which has held a series of large sports tournaments each year for more than a decade. Many Kharku Singh's have came from this village, such as Shaheed Bhupinder Singh Kooner allais Bhinda and Shaheed Bhai Mohinder Singh Kooner. In addition, a world renown agriculturist, Dr. Gurdev Singh Khush is also from Rurkee. 

Villages in Jalandhar district